The Canton of Roye  is a canton situated in the department of the Somme and in the former Picardy region of northern France.

Geography 
The canton is organised around the commune of Roye in the arrondissement of Montdidier.

Composition
At the French canton reorganisation which came into effect in March 2015, the canton was expanded from 33 to 62 communes:

Andechy
Armancourt
Assainvillers
Ayencourt
Balâtre
Becquigny
Beuvraignes
Biarre
Bouillancourt-la-Bataille
Boussicourt
Bus-la-Mésière
Cantigny
Le Cardonnois
Carrépuis
Champien
Courtemanche
Crémery
Cressy-Omencourt
Damery
Dancourt-Popincourt
Davenescourt
L'Échelle-Saint-Aurin
Erches
Ercheu
Étalon
Ételfay
Faverolles
Fescamps
Fignières
Fonches-Fonchette
Fontaine-sous-Montdidier
Fresnoy-lès-Roye
Goyencourt
Gratibus
Grivillers
Gruny
Guerbigny
Hattencourt
Herly
Laboissière-en-Santerre
Laucourt
Liancourt-Fosse
Lignières
Malpart
Marché-Allouarde
Marestmontiers
Marquivillers
Mesnil-Saint-Georges
Montdidier
Piennes-Onvillers
Remaugies
Roiglise
Rollot
Roye
Rubescourt
Saint-Mard
Tilloloy
Trois-Rivières
Verpillières
Villers-lès-Roye 
Villers-Tournelle
Warsy

Population

See also
 Arrondissements of the Somme department
 Cantons of the Somme department
 Communes of the Somme department

References

Roye